Page City is an unincorporated community in Logan County, Kansas, United States.  It is located along U.S. Route 40 west of Oakley.

History
The community was founded in 1884 as a depot on the Union Pacific Railroad.

A post office was opened in Page City in 1887, and remained in operation until it was discontinued in 1971.

Transportation
U.S. Route 40 highway and Union Pacific Railroad pass through Page City.

References

Further reading

External links
 Logan County maps: Current, Historic, KDOT

Unincorporated communities in Logan County, Kansas
Unincorporated communities in Kansas